1 FTS may refer to:

 1st Flying Training Squadron, United States
 No. 1 Flying Training School RAF, United Kingdom
 No. 1 Flying Training School RAAF, Australia